Joseph Thomas Zeller (May 2, 1908 – September 23, 1983) was an American football player.  He played professional in the National Football League (NFL) with the Green Bay Packers for one season and the Chicago Bears for six seasons.

College sport career
Zeller was an outstanding athlete at Indiana University Bloomington, playing both football and basketball.  He is the only person to have won the prestigious Balfour Award for the most valuable player in both sports in the same year, 1931–32, when he was also senior class president. Zeller finished his college career by playing every minute of his final five games.

References

External links

1908 births
1983 deaths
American football ends
American football guards
Chicago Bears players
Green Bay Packers players
Indiana Hoosiers football players
Indiana Hoosiers men's basketball players
Sportspeople from East Chicago, Indiana
Players of American football from Indiana
American men's basketball players